Northern Railway may refer to:

 North railway (Austria)
 Northern Railway (California), predecessor of the Southern Pacific Company
 Northern Railway of Canada
 Northern Railway Zone (India)
 Northern Railway (Namibia)
 Nevada Northern Railway
 Northern Railway (Russia)
 Northern line (Sri Lanka)
 Northern Railway (Western Australia)
 Berlin Northern Railway, a railway line in Germany
 Palatine Northern Railway, another railway line in Germany
 Emperor Ferdinand Northern Railway, a former railway company in the Austrian Empire

See also
 Northern (train operating company), in northern England
 Great Northern Railway (disambiguation)
 Northern Railroad (disambiguation)
 Nordbahn (disambiguation)